Chimezie Chukwudum Metu  (born March 22, 1997) is a Nigerian-American professional basketball player for the Sacramento Kings of the National Basketball Association (NBA). He played college basketball for the USC Trojans.

High school career
Metu's attended Lawndale High School in Lawndale, California. A four-star recruit, he was the No.46 recruit according to Rivals.com. Metu committed to the University of Southern California (USC) on May 12, 2014.

College career
As a freshman, Metu played in 34 games, starting 2. He averaged 6.4 points and 3.6 rebounds per game. He also had 54 blocks, which was the 2nd most blocks by a USC freshman since Taj Gibson. He also played 10 minutes in USC's loss to Providence in the first round of the 2016 NCAA Division I men's basketball tournament.

Metu started in all 36 games as a sophomore, averaging 14.8 points and 7.8 rebounds per game. He led the team to the 2nd round of the 2017 NCAA Division I men's basketball tournament. He was named 2017 Pac-12 Most Improved Player, 2nd Team All-Pac-12 and All-Academic Honorable Mention.

Metu played in 34 games as a junior, starting 33. He averaged 15.7 points and 7.4 rebounds per game. On February 23, 2018, he was named in a federal document that linked him to an alleged $2,000 payment from a sports agency, but was cleared by USC. On March 5, 2018, he was named 1st Team All-Pac-12 along with teammate Jordan McLaughlin. Being set to graduate in three years and after sitting out the 2018 National Invitation Tournament to avoid injury, he declared for the 2018 NBA draft.

Professional career

San Antonio Spurs (2018–2020)
On June 21, 2018, Metu was drafted by the San Antonio Spurs with the 49th pick in the 2018 NBA draft. Metu was later included in the 2018 NBA Summer League roster of the San Antonio Spurs. On September 4, 2018, Metu signed with the San Antonio Spurs. On October 20, 2018, Metu made his NBA debut, coming off from bench for about three minutes with two points, two rebounds and a block in a 108–121 loss to Portland Trail Blazers.

On November 20, 2020, the Spurs waived Metu.

Sacramento Kings (2020–present)
On November 28, 2020, Metu signed with the Sacramento Kings, but was waived on December 22 after appearing in four pre-season games. Two days later, he signed a two-way contract with the Kings. On April 28, 2021, the Kings signed him to a multi-year deal after making 28 appearances.

On August 15, 2021, during a 86–70 Las Vegas Summer League victory over the Dallas Mavericks, Metu was ejected after throwing a punch at opposing forward Eugene Omoruyi. The next day, the NBA suspended Metu for the Summer League championship game, which the Kings won.

On December 29, 2021, Metu hit a game-winning three from the right corner at the buzzer to propel Sacramento to a 95–94 home victory over the Dallas Mavericks.

National team career
On August 27, 2019, Metu was included in the Nigerian final roster for the 2019 FIBA Basketball World Cup.

Career statistics

NBA

Regular season

|-
| style="text-align:left;"|
| style="text-align:left;"|San Antonio
| 29 || 0 || 5.0 || .328 || .000 || .765 || 1.2 || .4 || .2 || .1 || 1.8
|-
| style="text-align:left;"|
| style="text-align:left;"|San Antonio
| 18 || 0 || 5.8 || .571 || .000 || .769 || 1.8 || .6 || .2 || .3 || 3.2
|-
| style="text-align:left;"|
| style="text-align:left;"|Sacramento
| 36 || 6 || 13.6 || .508 || .351 || .721 || 3.1 || .8 || .4 || .5 || 6.3
|-
| style="text-align:left;"|
| style="text-align:left;"|Sacramento
| 60 || 20 || 21.3 || .452 || .306 || .780 || 5.6 || 1.0 || .9 || .5 || 8.9 
|- class="sortbottom"
| style="text-align:center;" colspan="2" |Career
| 143 || 26 || 14.1 || .463 || .308 || .762 || 3.6 || .8 || .5 || .4 || 6.1

College

|-
| style="text-align:left;"|2015–16
| style="text-align:left;"|USC
| 34 || 2 || 18.5 || .518 || .000 || .513 || 3.6 || .5 || .6 || 1.6 || 6.4
|-
| style="text-align:left;"|2016–17
| style="text-align:left;"|USC
| 36 || 36 || 31.3 || .552 || .500 || .741 || 7.8 || 1.4 || .8 || 1.5 || 14.8
|-
| style="text-align:left;"|2017–18
| style="text-align:left;"|USC
| 34 || 33 || 31.0 || .523 || .300 || .730 || 7.4 || 1.6 || .8 || 1.7 || 15.7
|- class="sortbottom"
| style="text-align:center;" colspan="2"|Career
| 104 || 71 || 27.0 || .533 || .302 || .692 || 6.3 || 1.2 || .7 || 1.6 || 12.3

Personal life
Born in Los Angeles, he spent the first years of his life in California before moving to Nigeria with his father at the age of six. He then lived in Nigeria the following six years. In Nigeria, he played soccer.

References

External links

 USC Trojans bio

1997 births
Living people
2019 FIBA Basketball World Cup players
African-American basketball players
American men's basketball players
American sportspeople of Nigerian descent
Austin Spurs players
Basketball players at the 2020 Summer Olympics
Basketball players from Los Angeles
Centers (basketball)
Igbo sportspeople
Lawndale High School alumni
National Basketball Association players from Nigeria
Nigerian men's basketball players
Olympic basketball players of Nigeria
Power forwards (basketball)
Sacramento Kings players
San Antonio Spurs draft picks
San Antonio Spurs players
USC Trojans men's basketball players
21st-century African-American sportspeople